Hoyland Milton is a ward in the metropolitan borough of Barnsley, South Yorkshire, England.  The ward contains 35 listed buildings that are recorded in the National Heritage List for England.  Of these, eleven are listed at Grade II*, the middle of the three grades, and the others are at Grade II, the lowest grade.  The ward contains the villages of Elsecar and Hemingfield and the surrounding area.  Elsecar is located beside former industrial enterprises, including collieries and the Elsecar Ironworks.  A high proportion of the listed buildings are associated with the ironworks, which have since been used for other purposes, some of the buildings forming the basis for the Elsecar Heritage Centre.  The Elsecar branch of the Dearne and Dove Canal, now disused, passes through the ward, and two structures associated with it are listed, a canal basin and a bridge.  The other listed buildings in the village include houses and cottages, a church, a school, a market hall later used as an assembly hall, and a former flour mill.  Associated with the collieries are a former pumping engine house, and the entrance to a coal mine.  Outside the village are listed farmhouses and farm buildings.


Key

Buildings

References

Citations

Sources

 

Lists of listed buildings in South Yorkshire
Buildings and structures in the Metropolitan Borough of Barnsley